Gradišča is a settlement in the hills above the right bank of the Drava River in the Municipality of Cirkulane in the Haloze area of eastern Slovenia. The area traditionally belonged to the Styria region. It is now included in the Drava Statistical Region.

There is a small chapel-shrine in the settlement. It was built in the early 20th century.

References

External links
Gradišča on Geopedia

Populated places in the Municipality of Cirkulane